Thierry Vincent Moscato, known as Vincent Moscato (born 28 July 1965, in Paris) is a former French rugby union player as well as radio talk host and actor.

Moscato played as a hooker. He won the French Top 14 title with CA Bordeaux-Bègles Gironde in 1991, and he earned his first international cap on 22 June 1991 against Romania at Bucharest. He was sent off during a match against England at Parc des Princes in 1992 and never played for France again.

Honours 
 French rugby champion 1991 with CA Bordeaux-Bègles Gironde and 1998 with Stade Français
 Challenge Yves du Manoir 1996 with CA Brive
 Coupe de France 1999 with Stade Français

Filmography

Theater

Radio

Since 2007, He is a sport radio talk host with RMC, his daily show is called "Super Moscato Show".

References

External links
 Vincent Moscato profile

1965 births
Living people
French people of Italian descent
French male film actors
French rugby union players
Rugby union hookers
Stade Français players
France international rugby union players
Rugby union players from Paris
CA Bordeaux-Bègles Gironde players
Stade Bordelais players
CA Brive players
French male stage actors
Male actors from Paris